Antananarivo-Atsimondrano is a district of Analamanga in Madagascar. This district covers the outskirts of Antananarivo. Its postal code is 102.

Communes
The district is further divided into 26 communes:

 Alakamisy Fenoarivo
 Alatsinainy Ambazaha
 Ambalavao
 Ambatofahavalo
 Ambavahaditokana
 Ambohidrapeto
 Ambohijanaka
 Ampahitrosy
 Ampanefy
 Ampitatafika
 Andoharanofotsy
 Andranonahoatra
 Androhibe Antsahadinta
 Ankadimanga
 Ankaraobato
 Anosizato Andrefana
 Antanetikely
 Bemasoandro
 Bongatsara
 Fenoarivo
 Fiombonana
 Itaosy
 Soalandy
 Soavina
 Tanjombato
 Tsiafahy

References 

Districts of Analamanga